CAM Community School District (CAM CSD) is a rural public school district headquartered in Anita, Iowa. The district, which is mostly in Cass County, also has sections in Adair, Adams, and Audubon counties. It serves Anita, Cumberland, Massena, and Wiota.

It was formed on July 1, 2011, by the merger of the Anita Community School District and the C & M Community School District.

Schools
The district operates seven schools:

Secondary:
 CAM High School (Anita)
 CAM Middle School (Massena)

Primary:
 CAM North Elementary School (Anita)
 CAM South Elementary School (Massena)

Online Schools:
 CAM Iowa Connections Academy Elementary (Anita)
 CAM Iowa Connections Academy Middle School (Anita)
 CAM Iowa Connections Academy High School (Anita)

CAM High School

Athletics
The Cougars compete in the Rolling Valley Conference in the following sports:

Baseball
Basketball (boys and girls)
Cross Country (boys and girls)
Football
Golf (boys and girls)
Soccer
Softball
Track and Field (boys and girls)
Volleyball
Wrestling

See also
List of school districts in Iowa
List of high schools in Iowa

References

External links
CAM Community School District
CAM Community School District Independent Auditor's Reports Basic Financial Statements and Supplementary Information Schedule of Findings June 30, 2011

School districts in Iowa
Education in Adair County, Iowa
Education in Adams County, Iowa
Education in Audubon County, Iowa
Education in Cass County, Iowa
School districts established in 2011
2011 establishments in Iowa